Aleksandr Blinov may refer to:

 Aleksandr Blinov (equestrian) (born 1954), former Soviet equestrian and Olympic champion
 Aleksandr Blinov (sport shooter) (born 1981), Russian sport shooter